John Bray (fl. 1377) was an English physician and botanist.

Bray received a pension of 100 shillings a year from William, earl of Salisbury, which was confirmed by Richard II. He wrote a list of herbs in Latin, French, and English, 'Synonyma de nominibus herbarum.' This manuscript was formerly part of the collection of F. Bernard; it is now in the Sloane Collection in the British Library.

References

Year of birth missing
Year of death missing
14th-century English medical doctors
English botanists
14th-century English writers
14th-century Latin writers
14th-century botanists